Save Earth Series (SES) is an initiative to teach children the importance of wildlife. This non-profit organization is based in Kochi, Kerala, India and founded by wildlife photographer Shah Jahan. The purpose of the NGO is to create awareness among school children about the importance of wildlife.

Save Earth Series creates small documentaries that feature animals and involve the children in the creation of the videos. These videos are then published on the Internet and shown in schools.

The first video was released in October 2013 called the Lion-tailed Macaque.  There are two more releases after that: Mugger Crocodile and Hanuman Langur.  More work is being carried out to bring out more videos.

Save Earth Series videos
Save Earth Series - Lion-tailed Macaque
Save Earth Series - Hanuman Langur
Save Earth Series - Mugger Crocodile

Nature conservation in India